Ezhakadavu is a village towards the southernmost end of Chennithala-Tripperunthura panchayat. It falls under the Alappuzha district.

References

Villages in Alappuzha district